Mother Holly or Mother Hulda is a 1954 West German family film directed by Fritz Genschow and starring Renée Stobrawa, Rita-Maria Nowotny and Werner Stock. It is based on the fairy tale Mother Hulda by the Brothers Grimm, part of a series of adaptations directed by Genschow. It was made using Agfacolor.

Cast
 Renée Stobrawa as Frau Holle
 Rita-Maria Nowotny as Goldmarie
 Erika Petrick as Pechmarie
 Werner Stock as Schwarzer Peter
 Rudi Geske
 Melitta Klefer
 Anneliese Würtz
 Heidi Ewert
 Dagmar Kuckuck
 Gustav Bertram
 Eberhard Fechner
 Kurt Fleck
 Uwe Witt
 Hannes Huben
 Reiner Hengst
 Klaus Pfeifer

References

Bibliography 
 Jill Nelmes & Jule Selbo. Women Screenwriters: An International Guide. Palgrave Macmillan, 2015.

External links 
 

1954 films
West German films
1950s German-language films
Films directed by Fritz Genschow
Films based on Grimms' Fairy Tales
German children's films
1950s German films